In 1974, under the Local Government Act 1972, the administrative counties of Cumberland and Westmorland were abolished, and were combined with parts of Lancashire and Yorkshire to form the non-metropolitan county of Cumbria.

The administrative and ceremonial county of Cumbria were then divided into six local government districts. There are no unitary authorities in Cumbria.

The first section lists Members of parliament for the old counties of Cumberland and Westmorland, and the second section for the county of Cumbria.

Cumberland  and Westmorland

Cockermouth 
The Cockermouth constituency was abolished in 1918, when it became part of the Workington Constituency. 
 George Fletcher, Whig, 1698-1701
 Anthony Lowther, 1721-1722
 Charles Jenkinson, 1761-1767
 John Anstruther, 1790-1796
 Robert Plumer Ward, 1802-1806
 John Osborn, 1807-1808
 William Lowther, 2nd Earl of Lonsdale, 1808-1813
 Edward Horsman, Liberal, 1836-1852
 Richard Bourke, 6th Earl of Mayo, 1857-68.
 Wilfred Lawson, Liberal, 1885-1900
 Sir John Scurrah Randles, Conservative, 1900–1906
 Wilfred Lawson, Liberal, 1906
 Sir John Scurrah Randles, Conservative, 1906–1910
 Sir Wilfrid Lawson, 3rd Baronet, of Brayton, 1910-1916
 Joseph Bliss, 1916-1918

Workington  
The Workington Constituency was created by the Representation of the People Act 1918, which also abolished the constituency of Cockermouth.  

 Thomas Cape, 1918–1945
 Fred Peart, Labour, 1945-1976, now Baron Peart, of Workington
 Richard Page, Conservative, 1976-1979
 Dale Campbell-Savours, Labour, 1979-1983

Whitehaven  
The Whitehaven constituency, created 1832, was renamed Copeland constituency in 1983.
 William Lowther, 2nd Earl of Lonsdale, 1832–1833
 Robert Hudson, Conservative, 1924-1929
 Frank Anderson, Labour, 1945-1959
 Joseph Bede Symonds, Labour, 1959-1970
 Jack Cunningham, Labour, 1970-1983

Penrith 
 Henry Charles Howard, 1885-1886
 James William Lowther 1886-1918

Penrith and Cockermouth 
 James William Lowther, Conservative, 1918-1921
 Sir Henry Cecil Lowther, Coalition Conservative, 1921-1922
 Levi Collison, Liberal, 1922-1923
 Arthur Carlyne Niven Dixey, Conservative, 1923-1935
 Alan Vincent Gandar Dower, Conservative, 1935-1950

Penrith & the Border 
 Lt.-Col. A V G Dower, Conservative, 1945-1950
 R D Scott, Conservative, 1950-1955
 William Whitelaw, Conservative, 1955-1983

Carlisle 
 Wilfrid Lawson, 1859-1865
 Edgar Grierson, Labour, 1945-1950
 Alfred Hargreaves, Labour, 1950-1955
 Dr Donald Johnson, Conservative, 1955-1964
 Ron Lewis, Labour, 1964-1983

Westmorland 
The Parliament constituency of Westmorland was renamed Westmorland and Lonsdale in 1983
 Anthony Lowther, 1722-1741
 William Lowther, 2nd Earl of Lonsdale, 1813–1831
 William Lowther, 2nd Earl of Lonsdale, 1833–1841
 William Fletcher-Vane, Conservative, 1945-1959
 Michael Jopling, Conservative, 1959-1983

Barrow-in-Furness 
 Walter Monslow (Labour Party) 1945-1966
 Albert Booth (Labour Party) 1966-1983

Cumbria
This section lists Members of parliament for the new county of Cumbria since the re-organisation in 1983

Penrith and The Border 
 David Maclean, Conservative, 1983-2010
 Rory Stewart, Conservative, 2010-2019
 Neil Hudson, Conservative, 2019-

Barrow and Furness
 Cecil Franks, Conservative, 1983-1992
 John Hutton, Labour, 1992-2010
 John Woodcock, Labour Co-operative, 2010-

Westmorland and Lonsdale
 Michael Jopling, Baron Jopling, Conservative, 1983-1997
 Tim Collins, Conservative, 1997-2005
 Tim Farron, LibDem, 2005-

Copeland 
 Jack Cunningham, Labour, 1983-2005
 Jamie Reed, Labour, 2005-2017
 Trudy Harrison, Conservative, 2017-

Workington 
 Dale Campbell-Savours, Labour, 1983-2001 - now Baron Campbell-Savours
 Tony Cunningham, Labour, 2001-2015
 Sue Hayman, Labour, 2015-2019 - now Baroness Hayman of Ullock
 Mark Jenkinson, Conservative, 2019-

Carlisle 
 Ron Lewis, Labour, 1983-1987
 Eric Martlew, Labour, 1987-2010
 John Stevenson, Conservative, 2010-

Sources
  - lists, for example, all 72 MPs for Cockermouth from 1660-1918

References